Charles Inojie  is a Nigerian actor, comedian, movie director and producer. He is predominantly known for his comedic roles.

Early life and education
Charles is from a royal family. He grew up with his grandmother, and hardly recollects his mother because at a young age he was sent to another geographical location for the purpose of keeping his aging grandmother company. He aspired to someday be a lawyer but had a change of mind when he attended Bode Osoyin's writer's resort, where he decided to acquire a certificate course in dramatic arts. In 1993, he achieved this goal and would later graduate from the University of Port Harcourt in 1999.

Career
After making the decision to venture into acting, he then joined different dramatic and theatre clubs in his local town and started performing stage drama. He later decided to acquire more knowledge in the field of acting and then enrolls for a one-year acting program in Bode Osoyin's Writers Resort, where he obtained a certificate course in Dramatic Arts after completing the program in 1993.

After graduating from the University of Port Harcourt in 1999, he relocated to Lagos State. He became the assistant director at Lancelot Oduwa Imasuen's production company.

In 2016, members from the Screen Writers Guild of Nigeria (SWGN) unanimously appointed Inojie as president of their labor union.

Personal life
Inojie is married and has two children.

Selected filmography

Film 
The Royal Hibiscus Hotel (2017)
Dinner (2016)
Broken Soul (2015) as Chijioke
Shattered Soul (2015)
Open & Close (2011) as Agu
Corporate Maid (2008)
Corporate Maid II (2008)
Husband My Foot (2008)
Husband My Foot II (2009)
Desperate Search (2007)
Holy Man (2007)
Holy Man II (2007)
Holy Man III (2007)
I Need A Husband (2007)
I Need A Husband II (2007)
Onitemi (2007)
Over Heat (2006)
Over Heat II (2006)
Silent Burner (2006)
The Wolves (2006)
The Wolves II (2006)
Police Recruit
Love Wahala
Hottest Babes In Town
Wise In-laws
Desperate Poor Man
Nollywood Hustlers
Mr Ibu Dance Skelewu
Oga Madam
House Of Contention
Gamblers
De Prof
The Desperate Housewife
Nneka the Pretty Serpent (2020)
Badamasi (2020)
My Village People (2021)
Aki and Pawpaw

TV Series 
The Johnsons as Lucky Johnson.

See also
 List of Nigerian actors
 List of Nigerian film producers
 List of Nigerian film directors

References

External links

Living people
Date of birth missing (living people)
Nigerian male film actors
21st-century Nigerian male actors
University of Port Harcourt alumni
Nigerian film directors
Nigerian comedians
Nigerian film producers
Year of birth missing (living people)